Diethanolamides are common ingredients used in cosmetics to act as a foaming agents or as emulsifiers.  Chemically, they are amides formed from diethanolamine and carboxylic acids, typically fatty acids.

Examples include:
 Cocamide diethanolamine
 Lauramide diethanolamine
 Oleamide diethanolamine

References

Fatty acid amides